William Cuthbertson (born 6 December 1949) is a former Scotland international rugby union player. He won twenty one caps for Scotland playing as a lock.

Rugby Union career

Amateur career

In 1980 he played club rugby for Kilmarnock RFC. He went on to play for Harlequin F.C. He was also known by the nickname "Cubby".

Provincial career

He played for Glasgow District in Scottish Inter-District Championship.

International career

He was capped by Scotland 'B' twice in 1980.

Cuthbertson’s first international match was against Ireland at Lansdowne Road on 2 February 1980, where he was one of five new caps. The last of his twenty one caps was against Australia at Murrayfield on 8 December 1984.

Between 1981 and 1984 he played eleven matches for Barbarians FC.

Coaching career

He worked as a housemaster and rugby coach at Seaford College, an independent  school in West Sussex.

References

1949 births
Living people
Barbarian F.C. players
Glasgow District (rugby union) players
Harlequin F.C. players
Kilmarnock RFC players
Rugby union players from Kilwinning
Scotland 'B' international rugby union players
Scotland international rugby union players
Scottish rugby union coaches
Scottish rugby union players